The Deluge Fountain is a monumental sculpture fountain which has stood with all its elements between 1904 and 1943 and since 2014 in Bydgoszcz. Throughout the first time of its existence (39 years) and since its rebuilding, the fountain has always been one of the tourist attractions of the city.

History 

The fountain is outcome result of a competition issued in 1897 by the National Commission for the Promotion of Fine Arts in Poznań, which theme was water sculptures in Bydgoszcz. 
The competition, received 44 works, and rewarded a Berlin artist, Ferdinand Lepcke (1866-1909).

The construction lasted 6 years. It has been built downtown Bydgoszcz in the Regency Garden (now Park Casimir the Great), separated from the main street by St Peter and St Paul church. The unveiling ceremony took place at 1100 on 23 July 1904, the water system to the fountain being completed later in 1908. The event brought together representatives from Berlin and Poznań and many city residents. In 1908, Ferdinand Lepcke also realized an emblematic statue, the "Archer", which stood on the Theatre Square in Bydgoszcz; it is still today the most popular symbol of the city on the Brda and Vistula rivers. The cost of the entire project, according to various sources, ranged between 110 and 200 thousand German Mark.

The fountain "The Deluge", with its biblical message, captured perfectly the dramatic stageof the events and aroused admiration. Located among the greenery of the park, it was the object of frequent visits during the traditional walk and quickly became a regular feature of the urban landscape. It became the hallmark of Bydgoszcz. "The Deluge" was dismantled on 7 January 1943, when occupying forces decided so, in order to melt down the 8870 of kg metal for war purposes. After World War II only remained the pool, in which the statue was replaced by four stone fish bubbling water, realized by Józef Makowski.

Bydgoszcz fountain had two copies: in Coburg, Bavaria, the sculptor's hometown, where the sculpture is missing statues on both sides, and in Eisleben, Upper Saxony, which was also melted down in 1942 for war purposes. The Coburg replica has been used as an incomplete but useful blueprint in the reconstruction project.

The process of reconstruction was led by the "Social Committee for the Reconstruction of Bydgoszcz Fountain The Deluge" from 2006 to 2014. The funds were collected from diverse sources: social contributions, city of Bydgoszcz, province of Kuyavia and Pomerania and European Union. In April 2009, the first portion of the monument, the bear, has been exhibited in the city, waiting to be fixed back. In April 2010, the reconstruction of the original, colorful mosaic of the pool with circles and waves shapes, has been completed; it has been funded by Bydgoszcz city council. On 30 June 2010, came back the second part of the sculpture - a man fighting with a snake. Its author is Michał Pronobis from Radoszyce, and its cast -worth over 100,000 zlotys- was made by Jacek Guzera, from Kielce.

On 3 October 2012, the central figure returned to its original place. This piece has got a height of 3 m and weighs 1,200 kg. In 2014, a new fountain bowl has been re-installed together with a water treatment plant and a lighting system. The 7 m tall last element of the monumental fountain has been carried back to town on 14 June 2014. The unveiling ceremony took place on June 26, 2014.

In reconnaissance to this rebirth, a statue of professor Zygmunt Mackiewicz, famous Bydgoszcz surgeon and initiator of the reconstruction project, has been unveiled on May 15, 2016 nearby the fountain. Today (May 15) was the unveiling of the monument. The professor sits on the bench with his beloved fountain.

Elements 
The statue ensemble portrays the culmination moment of the biblical flood: people and animals who are left because they did not find shelter on the barge. The sculpture fountain is composed of three independent upstanding parts. The central fountain block is a man, supporting a fainting woman in his left arm, while he strives with his other hand to pull another man on his rock. At the foot of the rock is a young mother, dying from exhaustion, but who managed to save her helpless child.
Beside a lion climbs the rock, not doing any harm. This is the main figure, standing at the center of the basin.

The second block figures a lonely bear crawling on the rock, its head facing east and its right paw raised. In its clenched jaws, the bear holds the dead body of a cub. The third part of the sculpture refers to the Greek mythology: it reminds of Laocoön legend, with a man fighting a sea serpent contortioned. Realistic details outline the efforts of the muscles and the tension of the struggle. The fountain is 6 m tall and made of bronze, with total weight of 9 tons. The circular pool wall is out of red sandstone, with some Silesian gray granite, the surrounding pavement is arranged in a mosaic.

Gallery

See also 

 Bydgoszcz
 Freedom Square in Bydgoszcz
 Ferdinand Lepcke
 Casimir the Great Park
 The Archer (Lepcke)

Bibliography

References

External links 
  Oficjalna strona Stowarzyszenia Odbudowy Bydgoskiej Fontanny "Potop"
  Obszerna strona poświęcona fontannie "Potop"

Buildings and structures in Bydgoszcz
Fountains in Poland
Tourist attractions in Kuyavian-Pomeranian Voivodeship
Outdoor sculptures in Poland
Bronze sculptures in Poland
Snakes in art
Animal sculptures
Sculptures of men
Sculptures of women
Statues in Poland
Sculptures of bears